FLAME University is a private, coeducational and fully residential liberal education university located in Pune, India. It was formerly known as FLAME - Foundation for Liberal and Management Education

Leadership
The academic program at the FLAME University is led by Vice-Chancellor, Dr. Dishan Kamdar. Kamdar was previously the Deputy Dean, Academic Programmes & Professor of Organisational Behaviour at the Indian School of Business, the top ranked global business school in India.

Former Vice-Chancellor Dr. Devi Singh, who stepped down after a term at the helm, continues to play a leadership role as a member of the Governing Body. In the past, Singh served as Director of the Indian Institute of Management Lucknow.

Earlier, as Foundation for Liberal And Management Education institute, it was headed by Prof. Indira Parikh, former Dean of Indian Institute of Management Ahmedabad.

Academic programs

 Undergraduate Program -

FLAME University offers both three-year and optional four-year undergraduate programs with the degree nomenclature determined by the major pursued.
Three-year undergraduate degrees and their majors.
 B.A. - Economics, Psychology, Literary & Cultural Studies, International Studies, Environmental Studies, Journalism, Public Policy, Sociology.
 B.A. (Hons) - Economics***.
 B.Sc. - Applied Mathematics, Computer Science, Data Science and Economics*, Computer Science and Design*.
 B.Sc. (Hons) - Computer Science***.
 BBA - Finance, Business Analytics, Marketing, Human Resource Management, Entrepreneurship, Operations, General Management**, Design Management*.
 BBA (Communications Management) - Advertising & Branding, Digital Marketing & Communications, Film & Television Management, Communication Studies**.
Optional four-year undergraduate degrees and their majors. All four-year undergraduate programs lead to honours degrees.
 B.A. (Hons) - Economics, Psychology, Literary & Cultural Studies, International Studies, Environmental Studies, Journalism, Public Policy, Sociology.
 B.Sc. (Hons) - Applied Mathematics, Data Science and Economics, Computer Science, Computer Science and Design.
 BBA (Hons) - Finance, Business Analytics, Marketing, Human Resource Management, Entrepreneurship, Operations, Design Management.
 BBA (Communications Management) (Hons)- Advertising & Branding, Digital Marketing & Communications, Film & Television Management.
* Interdisciplinary majors. Not offered as minors. Only offered as majors. No minor combination possible. | ** Only available as a major in the three-year undergraduate program. | *** three-year undergraduate honours program available without minors.
Postgraduate Programs -

FLAME University offers MBA, MBA (Communications Management), Postgraduate Program in Entrepreneurship and Innovation (PGPEI), and M.Sc. (Economics) Postgraduate Programs

 Doctoral Program -
 Areas offered under the program are Management, Economics, Psychology, and Data Science.

 The FLAME Scholars Program -
The one-year FLAME Scholars Program builds on the foundations laid in the undergraduate years. It emphasizes mentorship, research, and participatory learning. After successful completion of the program requirements, the student is awarded a postgraduate diploma.

International collaborations

FLAME University has collaborations with international universities, institutes and research bodies. These include:

 Wellesley College: Academic collaboration with Wellesley College, a private, women's liberal arts college, ranked the 3rd best national liberal arts college in the United States in 2017, that facilitates international academic exchange, develop academic and scientific relationships, and support collaborative research activities.
Amherst College
Kelley School of Business, Indiana University Bloomington: Partnership with Kelley School of Business, ranked ninth for its undergraduate business program according to U.S. News & World Report, that includes study abroad programs, collaborative research, faculty exchange, executive education and curriculum development. The partnership is expected to extend to other areas as well.
Yale University: Association with Yale University, an American Ivy League research university, that allows FLAME University students to attend Yale's Summer Session Program.
 Babson College: Accepted as a member of the Babson Collaborative, an initiative by Babson College, a private business school in the United States consistently ranked as the number one college in entrepreneurship education for nearly three decades, to bring together educational institutions for the exchange of best practices in entrepreneurship education.
Sciences Po
IE University, Spain
York University, Canada
Boston University, U.S.
 Global Liberal Arts Alliance: FLAME University has accepted membership into the Global Liberal Arts Alliance. The Global Liberal Arts Alliance is an association of liberal arts colleges around the world. It was established in 2009. The goal of the consortium is to provide an international framework for cooperation among institutions.
India Global Higher Education Alliance: FLAME is a Founding Member of this Alliance between prestigious autonomous universities in India and outside India. Other institutions include Columbia University, University of Cambridge, University of Hong Kong, Pomona College, Azim Premji University and MIT.
 Library of Mistakes: The university has announced its association with the Library of Mistakes, Edinburgh; a charitable venture founded to promote the study of financial history.

Campus
The  campus of FLAME University is in Pune, Maharastra. The campus has been designed by Vastu Shilpa Consultants, an architectural practice founded by 2018 Pritzker Laureate B.V. Doshi.

See also 
 Liberal education
 Liberal arts education
 List of liberal arts colleges

References 

Private universities in India
Universities and colleges in Pune
FLAME University
Educational institutions established in 2015
2015 establishments in Maharashtra